Dysgonia correctana is a moth of the family Noctuidae first described by Francis Walker in 1865. It is found from the northern Moluccas to the Bismarck Islands and probably the Solomon Islands.

References

Dysgonia